"Wild Child" is a song by recording artists Kenny Chesney and Grace Potter. The song was co-written by Chesney, Shane McAnally, and Josh Osborne. It was released in February 2015 as the third single from the Chesney's album The Big Revival (2014). Potter had previously collaborated with Chesney for his singles "You and Tequila" and "El Cerrito Place".

Background
In a cover story for Billboard, Chesney drew a comparison between "Wild Child" and bro country songs: “Over the last several years, it seems like anytime anybody sings about a woman, she’s in cutoff jeans, drinking and on a tailgate — they objectify the hell out of them! [...] But I’m at a point where I want to say something different about women”. He told Taste of Country that he wasn’t searching for another Grace Potter duet, but when he finished writing the song, he knew it was unavoidable. “When you write about women, the best place to start is their spirit, and there’s not a woman that has a better free spirit than Grace Potter”.

Content
"Wild Child" finds its narrator falling for a strong and independent woman, whose spirit is free and whose nature is rebel.

Critical reception
Giving it a B+, Bob Paxman of Country Weekly wrote that "Those who prefer party guy Kenny might find this a bit too mellow for their tastes. But give this bit of introspection a chance and you'll find some cool lyrics…and a fine message."

Music video
The music video was directed by Shaun Silva and premiered on the USA Today website on February 11, 2015.

Chart performance
The song has sold 242,000 copies in the United States as of June 2015.

Year-end charts

References

2014 songs
2015 singles
Country ballads
2010s ballads
Kenny Chesney songs
Columbia Records singles
Male–female vocal duets
Songs written by Kenny Chesney
Songs written by Shane McAnally
Songs written by Josh Osborne
Song recordings produced by Buddy Cannon
Music videos directed by Shaun Silva